is a member of the Imperial House of Japan and the second daughter of Prince Tomohito of Mikasa and Princess Tomohito of Mikasa (Nobuko).

Biography

Early life and education
Princess Yōko was born on 25 October 1983 at the Japanese Red Cross Medical Center in Hiroo, Shibuya, Tokyo, She attended the prestigious Gakushūin School for her primary, junior high, and high school education. The Princess is a graduate of the Gakushuin Women's College, the Faculty of Intercultural Studies, the Department of Japanese Studies with a bachelor's degree in Japanese Studies.

Career
Princess Yōko has subsequently been active in various volunteer activities, especially with the Japanese Red Cross Society, from December 2006 to November 2012. She was inaugurated as the Patron of the International Association for Universal Design (IAUD) in August 2013, a position previously held by her father. She was also inaugurated as the President of the Social Welfare Organization Yuai Jyuji Kai in January 2014.

Public appearances
A practitioner of the traditional Japanese martial art of kendo from an early age, the Princess was selected to participate in exhibition tournaments in France and Germany in 2005, as well as the Aichi World's Fair held the same year. In July 2006, Princess Yōko attended the national convention Kendo Housewives.

Prince Tomohito's death
On 6 June 2012, Prince Tomohito died from multiple organ failure. His funeral and ceremony was attended by Princess Yōko and other members of the Imperial Family. In June 2013 in a statement about the Prince's household, it was announced by the Imperial Household Agency that "it [had] reduced the number of households in the Imperial family by one", integrating it into the household led by his father. According to the agency's officials the household integration won't have any effect on lives of the widow and daughters of Prince Tomohito.

Health
On 8 February 2022, Princess Yōko was hospitalized at the University of Tokyo Hospital due to moderate pneumonia after testing positive for COVID-19. Princess Yōko was discharged from the University of Tokyo Hospital on 16 February after recovering from Covid-19. She returned to her Akasaka estate where she would recover from pneumonia. The doctors gave their permission after judging the Princess's condition as stable.

On 25 March 2022, Princess Yōko spoke at a conference for deaf people about her "sensorineural hearing loss" and that it is sometimes difficult for her to hold a conversation due to her hearing loss. Subsequently, she revealed that her sensorineural hearing loss is due to Ménière's syndrome.

Titles and styles

Yōko is styled as Her Imperial Highness Princess Yōko.

Honours

National honours
:
 Member 2nd Class (Peony) of the Order of the Precious Crown

Notes

References

External links
 Her Imperial Highness Princess Mikasa and her family at the Imperial Household Agency website

Japanese princesses
1983 births
Living people
People from Tokyo

Order of the Precious Crown members
20th-century Japanese women
21st-century Japanese women